Lionel S. Reiss (1894–1988) was a Polish-American Jewish painter born in Jaroslaw, Poland (then in the Austro-Hungarian Empire), and grew up on the Lower East Side of Manhattan where he studied commercial art. His family had moved to the United States in 1898 when he was four years old. As immigrants to the United States, Reiss’ parents joined the ranks of other Eastern European Jews who were fleeing their native countries at the start of the 20th century. Lionel Reiss' family settled on New York’s Lower East Side neighborhood and Reiss himself spent the majority of his life in the city. Reiss worked as a commercial artist for newspapers, publishers, and a motion picture company. Eventually he became art director for Paramount Studios and is credited to be the creator of the Leo the Lion logo of Metro-Goldwyn-Mayer Studios.

Reiss became known for his portraits of Jewish people and landmarks in Jewish history, which he made during his trip to Europe, Africa, and the Middle East in the early 1920s. Being American and Jewish himself, Reiss became fascinated with Jewish life in the Old World. In 1919 Reiss temporarily left the United States to travel to the aforementioned regions, and recorded the everyday life that he encountered in the ghettos. His trip resulted in exhibitions in major American cities.

At the dawn of the Holocaust in 1938, Reiss, who had long returned to the United States, published his book My Models Were Jews, in which he illustratively argued that there is no such thing as a "Jewish ethnicity", but the Jewish people are rather a cultural group, whereby there is significant diversity within Jewish communities and between different communities in different geographical regions. Reiss was therefore presenting an argument against what he considered to be a common misconception that existed about the Jews. Later works included a 1954 book, New Lights and Old Shadows, which dealt with "the new lights" of a reborn Israel and the "old shadows" of an almost eradicated European Jewish culture. In his last book, A World of Twilight, published in 1972, with text by Isaac Bashevis Singer, Reiss presented a portrait of the Jewish communities in Eastern Europe before the Holocaust.

Today Reiss' art has been collected by many institutions, including the Brooklyn Museum; Bezalel Museum, Israel; Jewish Theological Seminary of America; the Smithsonian Institution, Jewish Museum, and the Tel Aviv Museum of Art.

References

1894 births
Jewish American writers
Austro-Hungarian emigrants to the United States
Jewish painters
Jewish American artists
American art directors
1986 deaths
20th-century American painters
20th-century American male artists
American male painters
20th-century American Jews